Richard Post Rumelt (born November 10, 1942) is an American emeritus professor at the University of California, Los Angeles Anderson School of Management. He joined the school in 1976 from Harvard Business School.

Academic career 
Richard Rumelt earned Bachelor's and Master's of Science degrees in Electrical Engineering from UC Berkeley. He worked as a systems design engineer at the Jet Propulsion Laboratory in 1963-65. He received his doctorate from the Harvard Business School in 1972 and joined the Harvard Business School faculty as an Assistant Professor. On leave from HBS, he helped found and teach at the Iran Center for Management Studies during 1972-74. In 1976 he joined the faculty of Management at the UCLA school of business. In 1993 he was appointed to the Harry and Elsa Kunin Chair in Business and Society. During 1993-96 he taught at INSEAD (France), where he received the Shell Chair in Management. Rumelt was a founding member of the Strategic Management Society and served as its president in 1995-98.

He is noted for having made several key contributions to the study of  business and corporate strategy. His 1974 study of diversification strategy inaugurated a stream of work on the performance implications of diversification. His 1982 paper with Steven Lippman showed how classical industrial organization results—profitability being related to concentration and to market share—could arise under perfect competition if there was uncertainty in the sources of efficiency. This result was key in the development of the "resource-based view" of strategic success. Rumelt's 1991 empirical follow-on (How Much Does Industry Matter?)  showed that the most of the dispersion of profit rates in the economy was between business units rather than between industries. His 2011 book (Good Strategy/Bad Strategy) redefined strategy as a form of problem solving. It was chosen one of six finalists for the Financial Times & Goldman Sachs Business Book of the Year award for 2011. His book The Crux: How Leaders Become Strategists was published in 2022 and was selected as on of the top business books of 2022 by the Financial Times and by the Globe & Mail.

Personal life 
Rumelt is married to Kate Rumelt; the couple enjoy hiking and skiing. They live in Bend, Oregon. His daughter is Cassandra Clare, author of The Shadowhunter Chronicles.

Select publications 
 Rumelt, R. 1974. Strategy, Structure, and Economic Performance, Harvard Business School Press.
Lippman, S. and Rumelt R . 1982. Uncertain Imitability: An Analysis of Interfirm Differences in Efficiency Under Competition, The Bell Journal of Economics
Rumelt, R. 1991. How Much Does Industry Matter?, Strategic Management Journal.
Rumelt, R., Schendel, D., and Teece, D. 1994. Fundamental Issues In Strategy, Harvard Business School Press
Rumelt, R.P., 1991. How Much Does Industry Matter?. Strategic Management Journal, pp. 167–185.
 Rumelt, R., 2011. The Perils of Bad Strategy. McKinsey Quarterly, 1(3).
Rumelt, R, 2011. Good Strategy/Bad Strategy: The Difference and Why it Matters, Crown Business.
Rumelt, R., 2022 The Crux: How Leaders Become Strategists, Public Affairs.
For more see www.thecruxbook.com/press

References

External links 

 Good Strategy/Bad Strategy: the difference and why it matters(video)
 Good Strategy/Bad Strategy: The Difference and Why it Matters(website)
Fundamental Issues In Strategy(Amazon)

Living people
University of California, Berkeley alumni
Harvard Business School alumni
UCLA Anderson School of Management faculty
21st-century American economists
1942 births